is a 1988 Japan-exclusive adventure video game for the Family Computer. The setting of this game is 20th century Japan.

Two-player adventure games were seen as very rare at the time of the game's release; even in Japan. However, only one person could partake in the animal quiz portion. Failing the quiz will force the player(s) to start from the beginning.

It is one of the few games for the Family Computer to use the Namco 163 wavetable sound chip, and is also one of the games that enables all eight sound channels provided by the chip, the other being King of Kings.

The end of the game contains an easter egg in the form of a developer's lengthy profane complaint about his coworkers' behaviour, which can be triggered at the game's ending after a series of button presses.

Gameplay

Erika and her brother Satoru are siblings who live together in a normal Japanese house. One night, a cat-like being gave them a mission to search for a powerful crown that will alter time and space for the person who possesses it. Players are forced to control both Erika and Satoru simultaneously, causing them to interact with their surroundings at the same time. In-game activities that require two players include shoplifting and eliminating locusts.

Interacting with characters and doing their quests will bring players one step closer to retrieving the Time Crown, the item needed to win the game. Manipulating items will allow players to solve the quests. Teamwork becomes important as one character cannot solve certain tasks without the other being present. A player using the second controller can also control one of the characters, freeing up responsibilities from the player using the main controller. When a player visits a landmark on the map, the view switches from a bird's eye view to a first-person perspective. A map where the buildings and surroundings are is always shown, except during storyline sequences and when players need to interact with their surroundings.

There are five different chapters in the game. Once the player completes the third chapter, the difficulty level becomes drastically harder. Satoru has the weakness of being able to drown, unlike his sister Erika, who can swim in the water levels of the game. Players may use Erika and prevent Satoru from drowning.

Notes

References

External links
Erika to Satoru no Yume Bōken at Giant Bomb

1988 video games
Adventure games
Atlus games
Fantasy video games
Japan-exclusive video games
Namco games
Nintendo Entertainment System games
Nintendo Entertainment System-only games
Video games developed in Japan
Video games set in the 1980s
Video games set in Japan
Multiplayer and single-player video games